Ramesh Bais (born 2 August 1947) is an Indian politician who currently serving as the 23rd Governor of Maharashtra since 2023. Bais also served as the Governor of Jharkhand from 2021 to 2023 and the  Governor of Tripura from 2019 to 2021. 
He is a member of the Bharatiya Janata Party and has served as Union Minister of State (Independent Charge) for Environment and Forests in the government of Atal Bihari Vajpayee. Bais has been elected seven times to the Lok Sabha, the lower house of the Indian Parliament, representing the Raipur constituency, including serving as a member of the 9th Lok Sabha (1989) and 11th to 16th Lok Sabha (1996-2019).

Personal life
Bais was born on 2 August 1947 in Raipur, Madhya Pradesh (now in Chhattisgarh) to Khomlal Bais. He completed his Higher Secondary education from B.S.E., Bhopal. He married Rambai Bais on 1 May 1968. They have a son and two daughters. Bais is an agriculturist by profession.

Education
Ramesh Bais went to B.S.E. in Bhopal, Madhya Pradesh for higher secondary education.

Political career
Bais was first elected to Municipal Corporation of Raipur in 1978. He won 1980 MP Assembly election from Mandir Hasod Constituency but lost 1985 Assembly election to his Congress rival Satyanarayan Sharma. He was elected for the first time to the Indian parliament as a member of the 9th Lok Sabha from Raipur in 1989 and was re-elected consecutively from 1996 to 11th, 12th, 13th, 14th,15th and 16th Lok Sabha.

Positions held

State level
 1978: Councillor, Municipal Corporation, Raipur
 1980-85: Member, Madhya Pradesh Legislative Assembly
 1980-82: Member, Estimates Committee, Madhya Pradesh Legislative Assembly
 1982-85 : Member, Library Committee, Madhya Pradesh Legislative Assembly
 1982-88 : Pradesh Mantri, Bharatiya Janata Party (B.J.P.), Madhya Pradesh

National level
 1989 : Elected to 9th Lok Sabha
 1989-90 & 1994-96 : Vice-President, B.J.P., Madhya Pradesh
 1990-97 : Member, Public Accounts Committee Member, Consultative Committee, Ministry of Steel and Mines
 1993 onwards : Member, National Executive, B.J.P.
 1994 onwards : Member, Executive Committee, B.J.P., Madhya Pradesh
 1996 : Elected to 11th Lok Sabha (2nd term)
Member, Committee on Agriculture
Member, Committee on Petitions
Member, Consultative Committee, Ministry of Industry
 1998 : Elected to 12th Lok Sabha (3rd term)

Union Minister
Served as Union Minister of State in Second and Third Vajpayee ministry holding various portfolios such as Steel, Mines, Chemicals and Fertilizers, Information and Broadcasting, and also Minister of State (Independent charge) for Mines and Environment & Forests.
 1998-99 : Union Minister of State, Steel and Mines
 1999 : Elected to 13th Lok Sabha (4th term)
 13 Oct. 1999 - 30 Sep 2000: Union Minister of State, Chemicals and Fertilizers
 30 Sep. 2000 -29 Jan 2003: Union Minister of State, Information and Broadcasting
 29 Jan. 2003- 8 Jan 2004: Union Minister of State (Independent Charge), Ministry of Mines
 9 Jan. 2004 - May 2004 : Union Minister of State (Independent Charge) Ministry of Environment & Forests
 2004 : Elected to 14th Lok Sabha( 5th term)
Member, Committee on Petroleum & Natural Gas
Member, Committee on Public Accounts
Member, Consultative Committee, Ministry of Power
Member, Hindi Salahakar Samiti, Ministry of Coal and Mines
 5 Aug. 2007 onwards : Member, Committee on Petroleum & Natural Gas
 1 May 2008 : Member, Committee on Public Undertakings
 2009 : Elected to 15th Lok Sabha (6th term)
 2009-2014 : Chief whip in Lok Sabha (BJP)
 6 Aug. 2009 : Member, Committe on Public Undertakings
 31 Aug. 2009 : Member, Committee on Petroleum and Natural Gas
 23 Sep. 2009 : Member, Rules Committee
 1 May 2010 : Member, Committee on Public Undertakings
 2014 : Elected to 16th Lok Sabha (7th term)
 Sept. 2014- May, 2019 : Appointed as Chairman, Standing Committee on Social Justice & Empowerment

Governor
 July,2019 – July, 2021 : Appointed as 18th Governor of Tripura
 14 July 2021 -  12th February 2023 : Appointed as 10th Governor of Jharkhand
 12th February : Appointed as the 23rd Governor of Maharashtra by the President of India in February 2023 following the resignation of the preceding governor Bhagat Singh Koshyari.

Tenure as governor
As the 10th Governor of Jharkhand, Bais had several noticeable tensions with the state government led by Hemant Soren during his tenure.  One of the most prominent issues was his failure to disclose the Election Commission's recommendation on Soren's continuation as MLA over a mining case. Bais also criticized the work culture in Jharkhand and flagged law and order as a significant problem. He returned several bills to the state government citing various loopholes, including bills passed by the government under the leadership of Hemant Soren, and the formation of the Tribal Advisory Council. Bais claimed he works according to the Constitution for the betterment of the state and stated that his successor would decide the fate of pending Bills and unfinished issues.

References

|-

|-

|-

|-

External links
 Home Page on the Parliament of India's Website

1948 births
Bharatiya Janata Party politicians from Chhattisgarh
Living people
India MPs 2004–2009
India MPs 2009–2014
India MPs 1989–1991
India MPs 1996–1997
India MPs 1998–1999
India MPs 1999–2004
Madhya Pradesh MLAs 1980–1985
Lok Sabha members from Chhattisgarh
India MPs 2014–2019
People from Raipur, Chhattisgarh
Chhattisgarh municipal councillors
Lok Sabha members from Madhya Pradesh
Politicians from Raipur
Governors of Tripura
Governors of Jharkhand